Alexandre Chichkov (born  1970) is a former competitive ice dancer who represented the Soviet Union. With Oksana Grishuk, he is the 1988 World Junior champion and 1988 Grand Prix International de Paris bronze medalist.

Chichkov started skating in Ukraine when he was six year old and relocated to Moscow, Russian SFSR at age 12. He began coaching in 1990 and joined Genesee Figure Skating Club in Rochester, New York in 2004. He settled in the United States in 1995 and became a citizen in 2002.

With Grishuk

References

Navigation

Soviet emigrants to the United States
Soviet male ice dancers
Living people
People with acquired American citizenship
World Junior Figure Skating Championships medalists
Year of birth missing (living people)